Giuseppe "Stefano" De Sando (born 31 July 1954) is an Italian actor and voice actor.

Biography
Born in Pizzo, De Sando began his acting career during the mid-1970s where he was mentored on stage by Vittorio Gassman and also made several appearances on film and television. He is best known as a voice dubber and he is the official Italian voice of Robert De Niro. He took on the role since Ferruccio Amendola’s death in 2001. Other actors De Sando dubs includes James Gandolfini, Ciarán Hinds, Ben Kingsley, John Goodman and many more.

Some of De Sando’s popular character dubbing roles include Walter White (portrayed by Bryan Cranston) in Breaking Bad, Tony Soprano (portrayed by James Gandolfini) in The Sopranos and Théoden (portrayed by Bernard Hill) in The Lord of the Rings film franchise. His animated roles include Don Lino in Shark Tale, Clayton in Tarzan and Buck Strickland in King of the Hill.

Dubbing roles

Animation
Don Lino in Shark Tale
Clayton in Tarzan 
General Li in Mulan
Aaron in The Prince of Egypt
King James in Pocahontas II: Journey to a New World
Shere Khan in The Jungle Book 2
Makunga in Madagascar: Escape 2 Africa
Melvin in Chicken Little
Buck Strickland in King of the Hill
Lenny Turteltaub in BoJack Horseman
Fluke in Finding Dory
Stan in The Wild
Professor Derek Knight in Monsters University
Botticelli in The Tale of Despereaux
Zugor in Tarzan II
James Woods in Family Guy
Blade Ranger in Planes: Fire & Rescue
Metal Beak in Legend of the Guardians: The Owls of Ga'Hoole
Metallo in Superman: The Animated Series (2nd voice)
Johnny Fiama in The Muppets' Wizard of Oz
Gomez Addams in The Addams Family
Vendel in Trollhunters: Tales of Arcadia
Emperor of the Darkest Ying in Legend of the Dragon
Count von Count in The Adventures of Elmo in Grouchland
Chief in Isle of Dogs
Hector Con Carne in Evil Con Carne
Hector Con Carne in Grim & Evil
Shanker Saunderson in Escape from Planet Earth
Cauldron in Once Upon a Halloween
Benjamin Mathius in Dead Space: Downfall
Fleetwood Yak in Rock Dog

Live action
Rodrigo Mendoza in The Mission
Le mari de la star-fantasme en croisière in One Hundred and One Nights
Sam in Ronin
Jack Byrnes in Meet the Parents
Jack Byrnes in Meet the Fockers
Jack Byrnes in Little Fockers
Eddie Flemming in 15 Minutes
Fearless Leader in The Adventures of Rocky and Bullwinkle
Nick Wells in The Score
Mitch Preston in Showtime
Vincent LaMarca in City by the Sea
"Noodles" in Once Upon a Time in America (2003 redub)
Richard Wells in Godsend
Archbishop of Lima in The Bridge of San Luis Rey
David Callaway in Hide and Seek
Bill Sullivan in The Good Shepherd
Captain Shakespeare in Stardust
Ben in What Just Happened
Tom Cowan in Righteous Kill
Frank Goode in Everybody's Fine
John McLaughlin in Machete
Jack Mabry in Stone
Carl Van Loon in Limitless
Hunter in Killer Elite
Stan Harris in New Year's Eve
Simon Silver in Red Lights
Jonathan Flynn in Being Flynn
Patrizio Solitano Sr. in Silver Linings Playbook
Joe Sarcone in Freelancers
Don Griffin in The Big Wedding
Benjamin Ford in Killing Season
Fred Blake / Giovanni Manzoni in The Family
Paddy Connors in Last Vegas
Victor Tellegio in American Hustle
Billy "The Kid" McDonnen in Grudge Match
Dragna in The Bag Man
Ben Whittaker in The Intern
Francis "The Pope" Silva in Heist
Rudy Mangano in Joy
Dick Kelly in Dirty Grandpa
Murray Franklin in Joker
Frank Sheeran in The Irishman
Walter White in Breaking Bad
Walter White in El Camino: A Breaking Bad Movie
Tony Soprano in The Sopranos
Colonel Winter in The Last Castle
Winston Baldry in The Mexican
Big Dave Brewster in The Man Who Wasn't There
Tom Valco in Surviving Christmas
Nick Murder in Romance & Cigarettes
Tiny Duffy in All the King's Men
Charles Hildebrandt in Lonely Hearts
Mayor of New York City in The Taking of Pelham 123
Mickey in Killing Them Softly
Leon Panetta in Zero Dark Thirty
Doug Munny in The Incredible Burt Wonderstone
Albert in Enough Said
Marvin Stipler in The Drop
Théoden in The Lord of the Rings: The Two Towers
Théoden in The Lord of the Rings: The Return of the King
Reverend Dennis Hasset in Oscar and Lucinda
Dick Koosman in Margot at the Wedding
Bill Maplewood in Life During Wartime
Aberforth Dumbledore in Harry Potter and the Deathly Hallows – Part 2
Sam Daily in The Woman in Black
Spencer Ludlow in The Disappearance of Eleanor Rigby
Piotr Aaron Litvenko in Hitman: Agent 47
Alessandro Valignano in Silence
Angelo Pazienza in Bleed for This
Colonel Zakharov in Red Sparrow
Gaius Julius Caesar in Rome
Hermocrates in The Triumph of Love
The Rabbi in Lucky Number Slevin
Prince Nizam in Prince of Persia: The Sands of Time
Tamir in The Dictator
Trevor Slattery in Iron Man 3
Ibn Sina in The Physician
Mazer Rackham in Ender's Game
Nun in Exodus: Gods and Kings
Geran in Collide
Hamid Karzai in War Machine
Charlie in Security
Costa Pasaris in Backstabbing for Beginners
Adolf Eichmann in Operation Finale
"Mighty" Mack McTeer in Blues Brothers 2000
Bill Sanford in Coyote Ugly
Bones Darley in Death Sentence
Julie "Baby Feet" Balboni in In the Electric Mist
Pope Sergius II in Pope Joan
Harling Mays in Flight
Sam Cooper in Love the Coopers
Ed Davis in Patriots Day
Dave Phillips in Once Upon a Time in Venice
Igon Siruss in Valerian and the City of a Thousand Planets
William Mulligan in Captive State
Robert Baratheon in Game of Thrones
Ardeth Bay in The Mummy
Ardeth Bay in The Mummy Returns
J. R. Ewing in Dallas
Carl Fox in Wall Street
Alan Grant in Jurassic Park
Alan Grant in Jurassic Park III
Thomas Andrews in Titanic
George Smiley in Tinker Tailor Soldier Spy
Tex Richman in The Muppets
Oliver Queenan in The Departed
Dave Kujan in The Usual Suspects
Dave Boyle in Mystic River
Charles Rodman in Rise of the Planet of the Apes
Bill Kilgore in Apocalypse Now Redux
Phil Cerreta in Law & Order
Jay Pritchett in Modern Family
Hernan Reyes in Fast Five
Lyle Haggerty in Contagion
Colonel Powell in John Carter
Jack O'Donnell in Argo
Joe Brody in Godzilla
Ned Fleming in Why Him?
Bryan Cranston in The Disaster Artist
Howard Spence in Don't Come Knocking
Bill Buck in Bandidas
Frank James in The Assassination of Jesse James by the Coward Robert Ford
Hank Cahill in Brothers
Sam Plame in Fair Game
Harlan Whitford in Safe House
Willie Grogan in Ithaca
Mr. Anderson in In Dubious Battle

References

External links

1954 births
Living people
People from Pizzo, Calabria
Italian male voice actors
Italian male film actors
Italian male television actors
Italian male stage actors
20th-century Italian male actors
21st-century Italian male actors